The Zeitschrift für Naturforschung B: A Journal of Chemical Sciences is a monthly peer-reviewed scientific journal. The journal publishes "fundamental studies in all areas of inorganic chemistry, organic chemistry, and analytical chemistry" in both English and German. Articles in German are required to be accompanied by an English-language title and abstract. According to the Journal Citation Reports, the journal has a 2014 impact factor of 0.744. The editors-in-chief are Gerhard Müller (University of Konstanz) and Annette Schier (Technical University Munich).

History 
The Zeitschrift für Naturforschung (English: Journal for Nature Research) was established in 1946 by the Max Planck Institute and the physical sciences (Part A) were separated from the other natural sciences (Part B) from 1947. A further separation occurred in 1973 when the biological sciences were moved to a new journal (Part C). The titles used for Part B have been:
Zeitschrift für Naturforschung. B, Anorganische, Organische und Biologische Chemie, Botanik, Zoologie und verwandte Gebiete. (1947–1961)
Zeitschrift für Naturforschung. B, Chemie, Biochemie, Biophysik, Biologie und verwandte Gebiete. (1962–1971)
Zeitschrift für Naturforschung. Teil B, Anorganische Chemie, Organische Chemie, Biochemie, Biophysik, Biologie. (1972)
From 1973, the part B journal was split into Zeitschrift für Naturforschung. Teil B, Anorganische Chemie, Organische Chemie (1973–1987) and the new part C journal Zeitschrift für Naturforschung. Teil C, Biochemie, Biophysik, Biologie, Virologie, separating the chemical and biological sciences
Zeitschrift für Naturforschung. B, A Journal of Chemical Sciences. (1987–present)

References

External links 
 

Chemistry journals
Monthly journals
Publications established in 1946
Multilingual journals
De Gruyter academic journals